The Beaver Dam Micropolitan Statistical Area is an area in east central Wisconsin. Its principal city is Beaver Dam, and it includes all of Dodge County. The Beaver Dam Micropolitan Statistical Area (MSA) and Fond du Lac MSA form the Fond du Lac Beaver Dam Combined Statistical Area. The MSA had an estimated population of 88,489.

Counties
Dodge County

Communities

Cities
Beaver Dam
Columbus (partial)
Fox Lake
Hartford
Horicon
Juneau
Mayville
Watertown (partial)
Waupun (partial)

Villages
Brownsville
Clyman
Hustisford
Iron Ridge
Kekoskee
Lomira
Lowell
Neosho
Randolph
Reeseville
Theresa

Unincorporated Places
Alderley
Ashippun
Burnett
Knowles
Lebanon
LeRoy
Minnesota Junction
Rolling Prairie
Rubicon
South Beaver Dam
Sugar Island
Woodland

Towns
Ashippun
Beaver Dam
Burnett
Calamus
Chester
Clyman
Elba
Emmet
Fox Lake
Herman
Hubbard
Hustisford
Lebanon
LeRoy
Lomira
Lowell
Oak Grove
Portland
Rubicon
Shields, Wisconsin
Theresa
Trenton
Westford
Williamstown

Micropolitan areas of Wisconsin